Lieutenant General Jean Evans Engler (3 August 190910 November 1993) was a United States Army officer who served in World War II, the Korean War and the Vietnam War.

Early life
He was born in Baltimore, Maryland on 3 August 1909.

Military career
He graduated from the United States Military Academy in 1933 and was commissioned into the infantry later transferring to the Quartermaster Corps. He then transferred to the Ordnance Corps serving in the Army Tank and Automotive Command.

After serving as Deputy Chief of Staff for Logistics, United States Continental Army Command he was appointed as commanding general United States Army, Japan on 25 May 1961. In early September 1963 he was appointed deputy commanding general U.S. Army Materiel Command then as commanding general Army Supply and Maintenance Command.

In December 1965 he was appointed as deputy commanding general United States Army Vietnam (USARV). He arrived in South Vietnam in January 1966. During this time he conducted a review of the relationship between USARV and Military Assistance Command, Vietnam. In April 1966 he requested the deployment of a Women's Army Corps (WAC) detachment to support USARV and he finally received approval from the Joint Chiefs of Staff on 25 July 1966 with the first WACs arriving in late October 1966.

On 15 June 1967 he was appointed as Deputy Chief of Staff for Logistics.

He retired from the Army in 1969.

Later life
He died on 10 November 1993 and was buried at Arlington National Cemetery.

Decorations
His decorations include Distinguished Service Medal (4) and the Legion of Merit (2).

References

1909 births
1993 deaths
People from Baltimore
Recipients of the Legion of Merit
United States Army generals
Recipients of the Distinguished Service Medal (US Army)
Burials at Arlington National Cemetery
United States Army personnel of World War II
United States Military Academy alumni
United States Army personnel of the Vietnam War